Ken Aitken (25 June 1928 – 3 June 2008) was an Australian rules footballer who played with Carlton and Collingwood in the Victorian Football League (VFL).

Aitken never played more than nine games in a seasons for the seniors but was a member of Carlton's 1951 premiership team in the league seconds. He joined Collingood the following year and was a reserve in the 1952 VFL Grand Final, which they lost.

He was dropped from Collingwood's list in the pre-season and signed with the Coburg Football Club. After retiring he was coach of the Carlton Under-19s side for four years, from 1956 to 1959

References

1928 births
Australian rules footballers from Victoria (Australia)
Carlton Football Club players
Collingwood Football Club players
Coburg Football Club players
2008 deaths